The 2018 Asia-Pacific Rally Championship season is an international rally championship sanctioned by the FIA. It is being held for the 31st time. The championship was contested by a combination of regulations with Group R competing directly against Super 2000 cars for points.

The championship began in New Zealand on 4 May and is scheduled to finish in China on 21 October after five rallies. A sixth event in India in December was cancelled.

Selected entries

Event calendar and results
The 2018 APRC is as follows:

Championship standings
The 2018 APRC for Drivers points was as follows:

Note: 1 – 14 refers to the bonus points awarded for each leg of the rally for the first five place getters, 1st (7), 2nd (5), 3rd (3), 4th (2), 5th (1). There were two bonus legs for each rally.

References

External links

APRC Live Podcast
APRC News and Video

Asia-Pacific Rally Championship seasons
Asia-Pacific
Asia-Pacific
Asia-Pacific